Almost all the common explosives listed here were mixtures of several common components:

 Ammonium picrate
 TNT (Trinitrotoluene)
 PETN (Pentaerythritol tetranitrate)
 RDX
 Powdered aluminium.     

This is only a partial list; there were many others. Many of these compositions are now obsolete and only encountered in legacy munitions and unexploded ordnance.

Two nuclear explosives, containing mixtures of uranium and plutonium, respectively, were also used at the bombings of Hiroshima and Nagasaki

See also
List of Japanese World War II explosives
Explosive material
Little Boy
Fat Man

Explosives